Skylar Fontaine is an American ice hockey defender, currently playing with the ZSC Lions Frauen of the SWHL top tier in Switzerland.

Career 
Fontaine began skating at the age of two. During high school, she played for the East Greenwich High School boys' team, ranking among the leading scorers on the team.

In 2017, she began attending Northeastern University, playing for the university's women's ice hockey programme. She scored 14 points in 38 games in her rookie NCAA season, winning a WHEA championship with the Huskies. She then improved to 36 points in 38 points in her second collegiate year, being named to the Hockey East First All-Star Team for the first time. In the 2019–20 season, she notched 42 points in 38 games, leading all Hockey East defenders in scoring and second in the entire NCAA. That year, she was named Hockey East Defender of the Year, the first Northeastern player to ever win that award.

Style of play 
Fontaine has been described as an offensive defender, with strong skating and hockey instincts.

Personal life 
Fontaine studies human services and criminal justice at Northeastern University. Her sister, Alex Tancrell-Fontaine, played NCAA hockey with Union College from 2011 to 2015, and her brother, Gunnarwolfe Fontaine, was drafted 202nd overall by the Nashville Predators in the 2020 NHL Entry Draft.

Awards and honors
2018-19 CCM/AHCA Second Team All-American
2019-20 CCM/AHCA Second Team All-American
2020-21 CCM/AHCA First Team All-American
 2021 Hockey East Best Defenseman Award
2021 NCAA All-Tournament Team

References

External links

Living people
1998 births
American women's ice hockey defensemen
Northeastern Huskies women's ice hockey players